Plectrypops retrospinis, the cardinal soldierfish, is a species of soldierfish from the genus Plectrypops. It can be found in the Western Atlantic Ocean, in Bermuda, southern Florida, and from the Bahamas to Brazil. It can be found in holes and caves in coral reefs. During the day, it remains in deep recesses.

References

Holocentridae
Fish of the Atlantic Ocean
Taxa named by Alphonse Guichenot